The Changthang Wildlife Sanctuary (or the Changthang Cold Desert Wildlife Sanctuary) is a high altitude wildlife sanctuary located in the Ladakhi adjunct of the Changthang plateau in the Leh District of the union territory of Ladakh. It is important as one of the few places in India with a population of the Kiang or Tibetan Wild Ass, as well as the rare Black-necked Crane.
Changthang Wildlife Sanctuary covers an area of 4000 km2. (Wildlife Department Ladakh)

Wildlife sanctuaries in Ladakh
1987 establishments in Jammu and Kashmir
Protected areas established in 1987